Jeremy Eugene Bridges (born April 19, 1980) is a former American football guard. He was drafted by the Philadelphia Eagles in the sixth round of the 2003 NFL Draft. He played college football at Southern Mississippi. Bridges was also a member of the Arizona Cardinals, Carolina Panthers and Washington Redskins.

Early years
Bridges graduated in 1998 from South Pike High School in Magnolia, Mississippi, where he played football and was the Pike County, Mississippi Player of the Year as a senior.

College career
Bridges played college football at Southern Mississippi and graduated with a degree in sports administration.

Professional career

Philadelphia Eagles
Bridges was drafted by the Philadelphia Eagles in the sixth round (185th overall) in the 2003 NFL Draft, but was inactive for the entire season.

Arizona Cardinals
Bridges was claimed off waivers by the Arizona Cardinals on September 6, 2004 and made his first ever NFL start on October 10 at the San Francisco 49ers. He spent two seasons with the Cardinals.

Carolina Panthers
Bridges was signed by the Carolina Panthers as a free agent and started in the final 14 games of the 2006 season. He was released by the Panthers on February 25, 2009.

Washington Redskins
Bridges was signed by the Washington Redskins as a free agent on May 3, 2009. He was released during final cuts on September 5.

Second stint with Cardinals
Bridges re-signed with the Cardinals on September 8, 2009. He played in all 48 regular-season games from 2009–11, starting 16. He injured his thumb in the 2012 preseason, and was placed on injured reserve. He was waived in November after reaching an injury settlement.

Second Stint with Panthers
Bridges was signed mid-season by the Panthers on November 14, 2012, "as a stop-gap for their struggling offensive line." He was released three weeks later.

Personal life
Bridges was arrested prior to the start of training camp for the 2007 season and charged with misdemeanor assault for allegedly pointing a gun at a woman in a strip club parking lot in Charlotte, North Carolina.  After a trial in November 2007, he was found guilty and given a 60-day suspended sentence and one year unsupervised probation; he was also ordered to pay a $500 fine and do 60 hours of community service.  The Panthers suspended him for two games for the incident.

On Sunday, December 7, 2008, Bridges was arrested in Ballantyne, Charlotte, North Carolina and charged with simple assault and battery and communicating threats.  The arrest stemmed from a confrontation at a local restaurant.  The incident started when Bridges ordered a bottle of Dom Pérignon (wine) from the restaurant bar Saturday night and shook it up, causing the champagne to spew and get other patrons wet.  The restaurant manager alleges that Bridges then got into a verbal confrontation with another patron and then a physical confrontation with the bouncer, at which time the police were called.  Bridges admits that he shook and opened the champagne bottle, but denies any physical confrontation.  He was released on $2,500 bond.  He was inactive for the Panthers' game on December 8, 2008, but it is unclear if he will face any more punishment from either the Panthers or the NFL.

References

Former NFL player owes $107K in child support in Arizona

External links
Arizona Cardinals bio

1980 births
Living people
People from Magnolia, Mississippi
Players of American football from Fort Wayne, Indiana
Players of American football from Mississippi
American football offensive tackles
American football offensive guards
Southern Miss Golden Eagles football players
Philadelphia Eagles players
Arizona Cardinals players
Carolina Panthers players
Washington Redskins players